Gas Street  Studios is a studio complex operated by ITV plc in Birmingham, England. The complex is currently only used by ITV Central for the broadcast of ITV News Central and much of the complex has been sold off for other uses. The complex had also previously been used for other broadcasts including the former home of CITV.
Today only 45 ITV Central staff work at the Gas Street Studios, significantly less than in June 1997 when the studios opened and there were over 200 staff working at ITV Central studios.

History
In 1994, Central's new owners Carlton Communications acquired land on Gas Street, Birmingham, to begin work on building a new digital studio complex, with the intention of replacing Central's Broad Street studios. The new centre was completed in 1997, when Central West's regional news department moved from its Broad Street base. A tribute to the Broad Street studios was broadcast on Central News West.

Branding
The building was originally designed to have the "Central Cake" logo on the outside, however the first branding used was the later Carlton-style logo which had replaced it in 1998. This was itself replaced with the Carlton name from 1999 until 2004. When Carlton merged with Granada, it featured ITV Central branding which was updated in 2006 when the new ITV logo came into use.

Uses

Former uses
The complex was used for the in-vision continuity links for CITV until this was moved to Granada Studios in Manchester in September 2004. From its opening until 2005 it was where ITV Central continuity was handled - the last to stop being produced locally after ITV switched to national continuity in 2002, which was broadcast from London. Central's transmission was also handled here until October 2004, when ITV plc closed the department and moved transmission to the Northern Transmission Centre in Leeds.

All networked programming for the ITV network from Gas Street ceased in 2005 leaving only the Central Tonight production from the studios. Central News East was moved to the studios on 5 February 2005 following the closure of Carlton Studios in Nottingham. The East Midlands version of Central News was then presented from Studio E at Gas street until 23 February 2009 when both regions started using the same studio.

Current uses
The only programme currently broadcast from the studios is ITV Central news programme ITV News Central.

The national ITV plc feedback service (ITV Viewer Services) is also based at the complex.

Non-broadcast uses
ITV have since also sold the Gas Street office building to Cube Real Estate, a commercial property developer, which has refurbished the interior of the building. While Central maintains office space and a single ground floor studio, the other studio and floors are available to rent as office space. The property is marketed as 22 Gas Street.

References

Buildings and structures in Birmingham, West Midlands
Television studios in England
ITV offices, studios and buildings